Ian Robertson (born 14 October 1966) is a Scottish former football player, who played as a right-back.

Playing career

Ian Robertson was born in Inverness in 1966. He began his professional career with Aberdeen in 1983, making his debut in a 3-2 win over St Mirren in a league game in May 1984. Having made just a handful of appearances for the Dons in the 1980s, he joined Montrose in 1991 where he remained until he retired in 1996.

References

1966 births
Living people
Footballers from Motherwell
Scottish footballers
Scottish Football League players
Association football defenders
Aberdeen F.C. players
Montrose F.C. players